Ania Pieroni is a former Italian actress, known for The House by the Cemetery (1981), Tenebrae (1982) and Inferno (1980).

Film career
Pieroni started her film career by taking a small part in the 1978 Alberto Lattuada film Stay as You Are. She also starred as a mysterious music student in the 1980 horror film Inferno by Dario Argento, and worked with him again playing a shoplifter in Tenebrae two years later. Her most famous role however was in the 1981 Lucio Fulci film The House by the Cemetery as the ill-fated babysitter Ann. Her last film was Fracchia contro Dracula, released in 1985.

Pieroni was offered to reprise the role of Mater Lachrymarum in Argento's 2007 film The Mother of Tears, but turned it down.

From 1985 to 1991, she was the director for a local TV station called GBR.

Filmography

References

External links
 

20th-century Italian actresses
Italian film actresses
Living people
1957 births